The Russian Imperial Movement (RIM; , RID) is a Russian ultranationalist, white supremacist, far-right paramilitary organization which operates out of Russia.

As of 2015, its leader is Stanislav Vorobyev. It has been designated as a terrorist group by the United States and Canada. Some of its publications have been blacklisted in Russia, although the Russian government refuses to designate the group as a terrorist organization.

Overview 
The Russian Imperial Movement (RIM) was founded in St Petersburg in 2002 by Stanislav Vorobyev.

Ideology 
RIM's website has been found to be part of a broader cluster of websites for political groups in Russia that promote "political Orthodoxy" and monarchy, drawing inspiration from the violent, antisemitic Black Hundreds of early 20th century Russia.: 202 Others groups in this cluster include "For Faith and Fatherland" and the modern revival of the "Union of the Russian People.": 202

Relationship with the Russian state 
The International Centre for Counter-Terrorism described the RIM's relationship with the Russian government as “an adversarial symbiosis”; as long as they do not commit terrorism domestically, they are free to operate and offer training to militants and to send troops to conflicts abroad where Russia has a stake in.

Western intelligence officials believe that the RIM has ties with and cooperates with Russian intelligence. The New York Times, citing unnamed U.S. officials, states that RIM is only partially aligned with the Russian government; the movement's leadership has been critical of the government's conduct of the Ukraine invasion, and has accused Putin of corruption. Yet, the RIM and Russian intelligence share common goals abroad, leading to a symbiotic relationship in which Russian intelligence has been able to influence the RIM's actions.

Foreign sanctions 
On 6 April 2020, the U.S. Department of State added the Russian Imperial Movement and three of its leaders (Stanislav Anatolyevich Vorobyev, Denis Valliullovich Gariyev, and Nikolay Nikolayevich Trushchalov) to the Specially Designated Global Terrorist list, thereby making it the first white supremacist group to be designated a terrorist organization by the State Department.

The group was officially designated as a terrorist group in Canada on 3 February 2021.

Imperial Legion paramilitary 

In 2008, RIM formed its paramilitary arm, named the Imperial Legion, which has been led by Denis Valliullovich Gariyev since at least 2014, and has called for "young Orthodox men" to dedicate themselves to defending Novorossiya.

Training 
The group maintains two training facilities in Saint Petersburg, one of which is known as camp Partizan, located south of  island. Partizan runs training in urban warfare, shooting, tactical medicine, high-altitude activity, military psychology, and survival.

Activities 
After the war in Donbas broke out in eastern Ukraine in April 2014, the RIM began training and sending volunteer soldiers to the pro-Russian groups in the conflict in July.

Some members of the Imperial Legion have worked as  mercenaries in the Middle East and North Africa. On January 30, 2020, it was reported that Vladimir Skopinov, who had also previously fought in Donbas and  Syria, had died in Libya - the second member of the Legion to die there.

Foreign affiliations and activities
According to the US State Department, RIM provides paramilitary-style training to extremists throughout Europe and operates two training facilities there.

Austria 
RIM is affiliated with the Black-Yellow Alliance of Austria.

Finland 
RIM has provided paramilitary training to Finnish neo-Nazis. Finnish neo-Nazis have been recruited by Johan Bäckman and Janus Putkonen who are aligned with Power Belongs to the People, a local pro-Russian party.

Germany 
RIM has provided paramilitary training to German neo-Nazis.

In May 2018, German Junge Nationaldemokraten held a gathering in Riesa, Germany, where representatives of RIM took part in together with related organizations such as the neo-Nazi Serbian Action and Bulgarian National Union.

On 5 June 2020, the German magazine Focus reported that the German security services were aware of the training of German neo-Nazis in Russia. However, they could not prohibit the Germans from traveling to Saint Petersburg for legal reasons. The authorities assume that Russian President Vladimir Putin is aware of the camps and "at least tolerates them". 

In 2022, the German government verified that members of the German NPD youth organization Young Nationalists and the German Neo-Nazi group "Third Way" trained in Russia in this center.

Spain 
In November 2019, a representative of RIM held a speech in an international conference in Madrid that was organized by the neo-Nazi far-right Spanish political party "National Democracy" which was attended by members of Alliance for Peace and Freedom.

On 29 April 2020, the Spanish Ministry of the Interior received an intelligence report which stated that RIM was inciting its right-wing extremist contacts in Spain to commit acts of terror, such as attacking the infrastructure, transportation system and using chemical weapons against the public.

The RIM - possibly acting as a proxy for Russian intelligence - is believed to have perpetrated the letter bomb terrorist campaign that targeted Spanish governmental institutions, embassies, and military and defense industry installations across Spain in late 2022. Important RIM members are known to have been present in Spain, and the RIM has fostered ties with Spanish far-right groups.

Sweden 
In 2008, RIM visited Sweden in order to attend Karl XII's Memorial Day in Stockholm together with the neo-Nazi Party of the Swedes. In the fall of 2015, it was noted that RIM had provided support to the Swedish Resistance Movement (SMR), and that RIM's leader Vorobyev had visited SMR in Sweden.

On 26 January 2020, a Russian man named Anatoly Udodov was arrested at the Arlanda airport after the police had discovered a cache of weapons belonging to him. The Swedish police had confiscated numerous firearms from him the previous summer due to his connections to SMR. Udodov was described as the representative of RIM in Sweden by Vorobyev and investigators believe he is the local recruiter for the RIM training camps. According to Swedish police Udodov is friends with a convicted terrorist, 23-year-old Viktor Melin. Melin was part of a group of Swedish neo-Nazis who went to Russia for military training, and upon returning was responsible for a string of bombings against minorities and political enemies.

United States 
According to an investigation which was conducted by Infobae, a new cell of Atomwaffen Division receives training from the group. The citizens of the United States who are affiliated with the group are also believed to have taken part in it. Later, the National Counterterrorism Center Director Christopher Miller confirmed that American neo-Nazis have had contacts with the RIM; specifically, on previous occasions, they have traveled to Russia to train with the group, however Miller described these connections as "relatively loose and informal". Leader of the Atomwaffen Division Kaleb Cole allegedly was one of the Americans who was trained by RIM. The ties between Atomwaffen and RIM reach back to 2015 when Brandon Russell met with the leadership of RIM. Additionally both groups adhere to James Mason's accelerationism. According to the Center for International Security and Cooperation;While RIM has aggressively built ties with European white supremacist groups, its outreach to U.S. organizations has historically occurred on a personal – rather than a formal or an institutional – basis. As of 2020, this pattern may be changing, given RIM’s alleged relationship with the neo-Nazi group Atomwaffen Division’s Russian affiliate.

Other 
RIM has also provided paramilitary training to Polish neo-Nazis.

Further reading 

 Russian Imperial Movement - Center for International Security and Cooperation

See also
Antisemitism in Europe
Antisemitism in Russia
Atomwaffen Division
Combat 18
Fascism
Fascism in Europe
List of fascist movements
List of fascist movements by country
Nordic Resistance Movement
Order of Nine Angles
Racism in Europe
Racism in Russia
Radical right (Europe)
Rashism
Russian nationalism
Terrorgram
Terrorism in Europe
Terrorism in Russia

References

External links
Russian Imperial Movement by Radio Free Europe

Accelerationism
Pro-Russian militant groups
Russian nationalist organizations
Paramilitary organizations based in Russia
Organizations designated as terrorist by the United States
Organizations designated as terrorist by Canada
Neo-Nazi organizations
Neo-Nazism in Russia